Maureen Elizabeth Magarity (born March 4, 1981) is an American women's basketball coach, and current head coach of the Holy Cross Crusaders women's basketball team. From 2010 to 2020, she coached for New Hampshire.

Playing career
Magarity played one season at Boston College before transferring to Marist, close to her native Poughkeepsie home, and where her father Dave served as the men's basketball coach for the Red Foxes. A two-time captain, Magarity led the team in scoring during the 2002–03 season and was named Second Team All–MAAC while leading the team to the 2004 NCAA Division I women's basketball tournament for the first time in school history, as well.

Boston College and Marist statistics

Source

Coaching career
After graduation, Magarity joined Marist's women's basketball staff for one season, then had a one-year stop as an assistant coach at Fairfield, before joining her father's staff at Army.

New Hampshire
On May 10, 2010, Magarity was hired as the sixth head coach in New Hampshire women's basketball history. After a 9–20 season her first year, Magarity guided the Wildcats to a 16–14 record and 4th place finish in the America East and the school's second-ever postseason appearance in the 2012 WBI. During the 2016–17 season, Magarity led UNH to a school record 26 wins and its first-ever America East regular season title, and an appearance in the 2017 WNIT. Magarity was the Kay Yow Coach of the Year, finalist for the WBCA National Coach of the Year, and America East Coach of the Year in 2017. She was also named one of the Thirty Up-And-Coming Women's Basketball Coaches You Should Know by High-Post Hoops in 2018.

Holy Cross
On April 14, 2020, Magarity was named the seventh head coach in Holy Cross women's basketball history. On March 2, 2022, Magarity won the Patriot League Regular Season Championship with the Crusaders. Days later, on March 4, 2022, Magarity was named the Patriot League Coach of the Year after guiding the Crusaders to a 20-9 overall record and 14-4 mark in league play. The 14 conference wins stand as the most in program history.

Personal life
Her father Dave is the former head women's basketball coach at Army, and former men's basketball coach at Saint Francis (PA) and Marist. Her brother Dave also played basketball at Marist. Additionally, her aunts Anne and Rosemary respectively played at La Salle and Villanova; her uncle Bill played at Georgia; and Bill's daughter Regan played at Virginia Tech.

Dave and Maureen are the first father-daughter pair to have coached against one another in NCAA Division I basketball history, with the first matchup between them being Holy Cross' visit to Army on January 9, 2021.

Head coaching record

NCAA DI

References

External links
 Official Biography, Holy Cross Crusaders

Living people
1981 births
American women's basketball coaches
Army Black Knights women's basketball coaches
Boston College Eagles women's basketball players
Fairfield Stags women's basketball coaches
Holy Cross Crusaders women's basketball coaches
Marist Red Foxes women's basketball coaches
Marist Red Foxes women's basketball players
New Hampshire Wildcats women's basketball coaches
Sportspeople from Poughkeepsie, New York